The Confédération des Syndicats Libres Autonomes du Congo (COSYLAC) is a trade union centre in Republic of the Congo.

The COSYLAC is affiliated with the International Trade Union Confederation.

References

Trade unions in the Republic of the Congo
International Trade Union Confederation